Şarkikaraağaç is a town and district of Isparta Province in the Mediterranean region of Anatolia (Asian Turkey). It is the site of Ancient city and bishopric Hadrianopolis in Pisidia, which remains a Latin Catholic titular see.

Şarki means "eastern", karaağaç means "elm".

The population is 9,849 as of 2010.

History 
See Hadrianopolis for Ancient namesakes
Hadrianopolis (in Pisidia) was important enough in the late Roman province of Pisidia to become one of the suffragan bishoprics of the Metropolitan of the capital Antioch, but was to fade.

Titular see 
The diocese was nominally restored in 1933 as a Latin titular bishopric.

It is vacant since decades, having had the following incumbents of the fitting Episcopal (lowest) rank :
 Leo Aloysius Pursley (1950.07.22 – 1956.12.29) as Auxiliary Bishop of Fort Wayne (Indiana, USA) (1950.07.22 – 1956.12.29), until succeeding as last Bishop of Fort Wayne (1956.12.29 – 1960.05.28), later restyled as first Bishop of Fort Wayne–South Bend (USA) (1960.05.28 – retired 1976.08.24), died 1998
 Bernardino N. Mazzarella, Friars Minor (O.F.M.) (1957.07.20 – 1963.03.13) as Bishop-Prelate of the Territorial Prelature of Inmaculada Concepción de la B.V.M. en Olancho (Honduras) (1954 – 1963.03.13); later Bishop of Comayagua (Honduras) (1963.03.13 – death 1979.05.30)
 Filemón Castellano (1963.04.10 – 1970.12.20), on emeritate, formerly Bishop of Lomas de Zamora (Argentina) (1957.03.13 – 1963.04.10); died 1980.

References

Sources and external links 
 District governor's official website 
 GCatholic
 Bibliography - ecclesiastical history
 Pius Bonifacius Gams, Series episcoporum Ecclesiae Catholicae, Leipzig 1931, p. 451
 Michel Lequien, Oriens christianus in quatuor Patriarchatus digestus, Paris 1740, vol. I, coll. 1049-1050
 Sylvain Destephen, 'Prosopographie chrétienne du Bas-Empire 3. Prosopographie du diocèse d'Asie (325-641), Paris 2008

Populated places in Isparta Province
Şarkikaraağaç District
Pisidia
Towns in Turkey